Cochrane Dam is a run-of-the river hydroelectric dam on the Missouri River, about  northeast of Great Falls in the U.S. state of Montana. Its power station has two generators capable of producing 64 megawatts. Construction of the dam was finished in 1958. Montana Power Company originally built the dam, PPL Corporation purchased it in 1997 and sold it to NorthWestern Corporation in 2014.

References

Dams completed in 1958
Energy infrastructure completed in 1958
Dams in Montana
Run-of-the-river power stations
Buildings and structures in Cascade County, Montana
NorthWestern Corporation dams
Dams on the Missouri River
Gravity dams